Friendly TV was a British television channel, owned by Hi2 Limited. Much of the channel's output was made up of interactive programmes and games which allowed user participation by phone or mobile phone using SMS messaging.

The channel was launched in 2003 on Sky Digital channel 268 and received  immediate criticism  for its poor content.  Program content was devoted to an internet-based game called Brainbox, or a lengthy computer games show called GamerWeb contrary to the station's EPG.

A notable incident occurred in May 2003 when presenters were accidentally broadcast alleging that Nicole Kidman was a lesbian.

Shortly after the channel was launched it ran a number of wrestling shows including Irish Whip Wrestling, Frontier Wrestling Alliance, and Pro Wrestling Noah. These were pilots for the TV station which was launched as The Wrestling Channel and later became The Fight Network.

The channel broadcast onto a number of Sky channels and was responsible for programmes such as Bikini Beach, Cash House, Stash the Cash, Vegas 247, and Live Roulette.

The channel closed on 6 January 2010, when the EPG slot was sold to the adult channel Dirty Talk.

Nicole Kidman incident
This incident which made Friendly TV infamous occurred in May 2003 when former QVC presenter Paul Lavers and his co-presenter, Karen Witchalls, were fronting the morning show. The show mainly consisted of items based on that day's newspapers. The show ran a text poll with a Nicole Kidman related question.

The channel did not show adverts at this time even though they still had breaks, which consisted of the studio camera zooming in to a television screen in the studio that was displaying details of the poll (notably excluding the cost of the text message), which means it appears they couldn't put the graphics directly to air. Instead of turning the presenter's microphones down during the break, everything the presenters and the studio crew said was clearly audible, including the unfounded rumour that Kidman was gay. The presenters apologised when they learned that this had been accidentally broadcast.

Victor Lewis Smith wrote a scathing review of this episode the next day.

Ofcom Content Sanctions Committee 
 
Eventually, in February 2010, an Ofcom Sanctions Committee ruled against Friendly TV and related broadcasters, concluding that "serious and repeated breaches" had been committed. David Wainwright attended the hearing as the representative of the broadcasters.

To quote directly from the judgment of the Ofcom Sanctions Committee:

In his capacity as Managing Director and Head of Compliance of the broadcasters, Wainwright made oral submissions to the Committee and the Committee then put questions to him. The Committee concluded that the breaches were serious making specific reference to explicit and graphic sex material broadcast without access restrictions after the 21:00 watershed. In accordance with Ofcom's statutory duty to protect the under-eighteens.

See also 
 Ofcom

References

External links
 Web Archive page of FriendlyTV
 Web Archive page of Hi2
 Ofcom Broadcasting Code July 2005
 YouTube - example of broadcast content

Defunct television channels in the United Kingdom
Television channels and stations disestablished in 2010
Television channels and stations established in 2003
Television channels in the United Kingdom